The 2011 Winmau World Masters was a major televised tournament on the BDO/WDF calendar for 2011. It took place from 1–4 September in the Hull Arena, which hosted the event for the first time, taking over from the nearby Hull City Hall.

Defending men's champion Martin Adams lost in the semi finals to Scott Waites, who went on to win his first World Masters title beating Dean Winstanley by 7 sets to 2 in the final. Defending women's Master Julie Gore lost in the semi finals to Trina Gulliver.

Seeds

Men

These were finalised on completion of the 2011 Swedish Open on 19–21 August. The men's seeds were exempt until the Last 16 stage and could not play each other until the quarter final stage.

  Martin Adams
  Dean Winstanley
  Robbie Green
  Scott Waites
  Gary Robson
  Ross Montgomery
  Tony West
  John Walton

Women

These were finalised on completion of the 2011 Swedish Open on 19–21 August. The ladies seeds entered at the start of the competition however could not play each other until the quarter final stage. Francis Hoenselaar was scheduled to be the number 8 seed, but pulled out for personal reasons.

  Deta Hedman
  Julie Gore
  Trina Gulliver
  Irina Armstrong
  Karen Lawman
  Anastasia Dobromyslova
  Lorraine Farlam
  Karin Krappen

There were no seedings in the boys or girls events.

Men's Draw

Last 24 onwards. All the below matches were televised.

Sets were best of 3 legs.

Ladies Draw

Last 8 onwards. The Semi-finals and final were televised.

Boys Draw

Last 8 onwards.

Girls Draw

Last 8 onwards.

Television coverage
The tournament was shown in the UK by sports subscription channel ESPN who took over from the BBC who broadcast the last ten World Masters.  ESPN broadcast the last three days of the tournament. The tournament was shown in the USA for the very first time with ESPN3 broadcasting it. The event was also shown on Eurosport and Eurosport Asia.

References 

World Masters (darts)
World Masters
World Masters (darts)
Sport in Kingston upon Hull
2010s in Kingston upon Hull